Sepidan County is in Fars province, Iran. The capital of the county is the city of Ardakan. According to the 2006 census, the county's population was 87,801 in 20,127 households. The following census in 2011 counted 89,398 people in 24,172 households. At the 2016 census, the county's population was 91,049 in 26,381 households. Beyza District was separated from the county in 2018 to form Beyza County.

Administrative divisions

The population history and structural changes of Sepidan County's administrative divisions over three consecutive censuses are shown in the following table. The latest census shows three districts, eight rural districts, and three cities.

References

 

Counties of Fars Province